The president of the Chamber of Deputies of Paraguay is the presiding officer in the Paraguayan lower house. The president is elected by the Chamber of Deputies of Paraguay for a one-year term.

Chamber of Deputies 1870-1940

Cámara de Representantes 1940-1968

Chamber of Deputies since 1968

Sources 

Chamber of Deputies, Presidents
Paraguay
Paraguay, Chamber of Deputies
List